Juan Ignacio Silva Naranjo (born 29 September 1990) is a Chilean footballer who plays as a midfielder for Unión Bellavista.

Career
Silva's first club were Chilean Primera División team Deportes La Serena. He made his professional debut on 30 January 2010 during a 2–4 loss to Universidad de Chile. Seven more appearances arrived between 2010 and 2012, including two in 2012 which ended with relegation to Primera B de Chile. In January 2013, Silva joined Deportes Melipilla of Segunda División de Chile. He was sent off on his third tier debut in an away loss to San Antonio Unido on 23 February. Two years later, Silva signed for Segunda División side Deportes Ovalle. Eight appearances followed as Ovalle were relegated to the Chilean Tercera División.

In 2017, Silva began featuring for regional amateur ANFA club Unión Bellavista.

Personal life
As well as being a footballer, Silva also plays as the lead drummer for his band, D'Brous.

Career statistics
.

References

External links

1990 births
Living people
Place of birth missing (living people)
Chilean footballers
Association football midfielders
Chilean Primera División players
Segunda División Profesional de Chile players
Deportes La Serena footballers
Deportes Melipilla footballers
Deportes Ovalle footballers